Husham Al-Husainy is an Iraqi-American Sheikh of the Karbalaa Islamic Education Center, a Shia mosque servicing largely people of Iraqi and Lebanese descent in Dearborn, Michigan. Al-Husainy arrived in the United States in the late 1970s as Saddam Hussein was rising into power. He is a spokesman of the Iraqi expatriate community in America. During the American occupation of Iraq, Al-Husainy has gone from supporting the toppling of Hussein's regime to criticizing the continued occupation as inciting more bloodshed.

Karbaala Islamic Education Center 
Imam Husham Al-Husainy has been active in community affairs for more than 25 years in the metro-Detroit area. He is the Director of the Karbalaa Islamic Education Center. The Imam has been involved in many domestic and international meetings. He is always in contact with the Iraqi refugees that seek services at his center. A community of about 15,000 Iraqis that migrated from Saudi Arabia and the surrounding countries has improved rapidly over the short period of time as residents. Since the fall of the Iraqi dictator Saddam Hussein the Iraqis at home have been given a chance to go back to their homeland and visit their families. Imam Husham al-huainy's vision to build and maintain services for the growing community has been quite a challenge, although with the help of the Muslim communities in Dearborn, and the cities surrounding Michigan they have become one of the most influential mosques in the region.

Politics 
Many of the Arab-Americans in Michigan were generally associated with Republican policies prior to September 11, 2001 and the Iraq War. However, the Iraq War turned opinions against the Republicans to a degree. Al-Hussainy was invited to give the invocation to the Democratic National Committee's Annual Winter Meeting in Washington, D.C. in 2006.

Al-Husainy has cooperated with the United States on security measures for instance in a recent case where it has been alleged that Detroit area resident, Najib Shemami, was a spy.

References

External links 
Imam prays to stop 'oppression and occupation' at DNC meeting
  DHinMI at dailykos follows Al-Husainy's published views of the Iraq War in Bush Alienates the Imam in 7 Easy Steps published Fri Aug 13, 2004 at 05:04:44 PM PDT (Accessed May 17, 2007)here
 Husham Al-Husainy debates Christian Prince

Living people
Year of birth missing (living people)
Islam-related controversies in North America
Islam and other religions
Iraqi emigrants to the United States
American Shia Muslims
Iraqi Shia Muslims